El Roble de Ilobasco (formerly known as Asociación de Futbolistas de Ilobasco) are a Salvadoran football club based in Ilobasco in the Cabañas department of El Salvador.

History

El Roble

Rebrand A.F.I. and close to promotion 
The club was renamed in 2005 to A.F.I., Asociación de Futbolistas de Ilobasco.

After a strong season which ended with the club winning the 2009 Clausura Segunda division title, The club reached promotion-relegation promotion two legged series match against Alianza. The first match played in the Estadio Mauricio Vides de Ilobasco ended in a 1-1 draw with the sole goal for the club coming from José Luis Amaya. The second game finished 3-1 in favour for Alianza, with the sole goal coming from José Luis Amaya again. The series ended 4-2 in favour of Alianza and would be last time the club came close to promotion as AFI.

Recent events
However in 2010, it reverted to being called El Roble. The club spent most of its time in the Second Division, with a few years in Primera Division de Futbol Profesional (1994–1998).

In 2018, El Roble de Ilobasco due to Financial problem were forced to sell their spot in the segunda division and eventually dissolved

Honours
Segunda Division: 1
Clausura 2009

Records

Club Records
 First Match (prior to creation of a league): vs. TBD (a club from TBD), Year
 First Match (official): vs. TBD, year
 Most points in La Primera: 00 points (00 win, 00 draws, 0 losses) Year/Year
 Least points in La Primera: 00 points (0 win, 0 draws, 00 losses) Year/year

Individual records
 Most capped player for El Salvador: 50 (0 whilst at El Roble), TBD
 Most international caps for El Salvador while a El Roble player: 1, TBD
 Most goals in a season, all competitions: unknown player, O (Year/year) (00 in League, 00 in Cup competitions)
 Most goals in a season, La Primera: TBD, 7

Stadium
 Cancha Mauricio Vides de Ilobasco,, (2002–present)

The 2,000-capacity Estadio de Chalchuapa has been Once Lobos's home stadium since its creation 2002. The team's headquarters are located in TBD.

Current squad
As of:

Captains

Personnel

Management

Management

Notable Coaches

El Roble (1989–2008), (2012–2018)
 TBD (1989–1990)
 Carlos Jurado (1991–92)
 Conrado Miranda (1993– September 95)
 Luis Angel León (September 1995–January 96)
 Conrado Miranda (January 1996- March 1996)
 Víctor Manuel Pacheco (March 1996 - October 1997)
 Didier Castro (October 1997 - 1998)
 Guillermo Navarro (2002)
 Ricardo Mena Laguán (2003)
 Carlos Antonio Meléndez (2011–2012)
 Juan Ramon Paredes (2012–2013)
 Guillermo Navarro (2013–2014)
 Ramón Avilés (2014 – Sep 2014)
 Victor Coreas (Sep 2014 – July 2015)
 Victor Giron (July 2015 – Aug 2015)
 Fausto Vasquez (August 2015–)
 Victor Coreas (2017–2018)
 Hiatus (2018-present)

A.F.I (2009–2011)
 Miguel Ángel Soriano (−2009)
 Luis Ángel León (2009–10)
 Víctor Coreas (2010)
 Miguel Ángel Soriano (2010–2011)

References

Football clubs in El Salvador